There are 42 national parks in Chile covering a total area of 13,206,810 hectares.

Table

See also
 Protected areas of Chile; protected natural areas 
 National Monuments of Chile; structures and sites of cultural heritage

References

National Parks
Chile
National parks